The Chinese Loess Plateau, or simply the Loess Plateau, is a plateau in north-central China formed of loess, a clastic silt-like sediment formed by the accumulation of wind-blown dust. It is located southeast of the Gobi Desert and is surrounded by the Yellow River. It includes parts of the Chinese provinces of Gansu, Shaanxi and Shanxi. The depositional setting of the Chinese Loess Plateau was shaped by the tectonic movement in the Neogene period, after which strong southeast winds caused by the East Asian Monsoon transported sediment to the plateau during the Quaternary period. The three main morphological types in the Loess Plateau are loess platforms, ridges and hills, formed by the deposition and erosion of loess. Most of the loess comes from the Gobi Desert and other nearby deserts. The sediments were transported to the Loess Plateau during interglacial periods by southeasterly prevailing winds and winter monsoon winds. After the deposition of sediments on the plateau, they were gradually compacted to form loess under the arid climate.

The Loess Plateau is one of the largest and thickest loess plateaus in the world. Because of the strong winds, erosion is also powerful across the plateau. Therefore, erosional features, including wind escarpments, loess vertical joints and gullies are present. In the past few decades, the environment and climate has changed, including the rainfall pattern, vegetation cover, and the natural hazards. These changes may relate to human development in the plateau; Chinese environmental officials are trying to find sustainable ways to manage the region.

Geology

Geomorphology 
There are three main types of morphology in the Loess Plateau. They are loess platform, loess ridges, and loess hills. Loess tableland is flat and with many loess strata. It is mostly located at south Loess Plateau. Loess ridges are formed by erosion and are located at the central Loess Plateau. Loess Hills are conical dunes and are located at the north Loess Plateau. The geomorphology of the Loess Plateau is formed by the erosion and deposition of loess.

In the Loess Plateau, the geomorphology usually changes from rocky mountains to Alluvial plain at piedmont to river valley belt. This pattern keeps repeating from the Northwest to the Southeast of the Loess Plateau.

The height of the rocky mountains is much higher than the loess deposit. The height and morphology of the mountains are different in different locations.

One of the highest mountains in the Loess Plateau is called Mahan Mountain. The elevation of this mountain is around 3670 m, which is 1300 m higher than the loess line. It is a flat-topped mountain and has paleo-peneplain remnants on the mountain top.

Some of the mountain slopes, especially the windward slope (north slope), were forested in the past.

The alluvial plain at piedmont is composed of Alluvial fans which can be found in this area, and which are located at the foot of the rocky mountains.

The size of this belt depends on the amount of runoff and weathering materials from the rocky mountains.

Old alluvial fans are covered with eolian loess. Further from the rocky mountains, loess tableland and loess “Ping” can be found and even links with the next belt, which is the river valley belt.

The River valley belt includes flood plains, river terraces and river beds. The terraces with higher height are mostly covered with thick loess. It will change to another form of landscape, which is loess ridge, by strong erosion. If the erosion is weak, the higher terraces will change to loess tableland. These flat river basins, which include valley flat and lower terraces, are important for construction and agricultural activities.

Erosional features

Wind escarpment and bedrock ridges 

Mu Us Desert is located in the northwest of the Loess Plateau. Wind escarpment in the Loess Plateau marks a boundary between Mu Us Desert and the Loess Plateau. It also represents a transition from loess accumulation to wind erosion in the Loess Plateau. Many linear bedrock ridges are formed behind the wind escarpment, which are parallel to the wind direction. In the northern Loess Plateau, the bedrock ridges are pointing towards the northeast. However, the direction of the ridges slowly rotates to the North in the central Loess Plateau. At North Loess Plateau, the ridges are oriented 118° ±14° while they are oriented 179° ± 11° at central Loess Plateau. This indicates the role of wind erosion.

The monsoon wind direction in Quaternary is consistent with modern climatology. To observe near-surface wind vectors, they compared the wind in Quaternary and modern wind. The results show that the wind direction in winter and spring-storm events are the same as the orientation of the bedrock ridges. Therefore, modern windstorms also contribute to shaping the eolian geomorphology.

The Yellow River has provided sediments supply continuously which has been reworked by wind. Also, the wind erosion becomes stronger when it reaches the Loess Plateau wind escarpment. Because of the streamline compression of the wind escarpment, the wind speed is increased.

As a result, the Loess Plateau is not only a site of loess deposition but also a source of dust because of strong wind erosion. Wind erosion is very severe during the glacial period. During the glacial period, there is very little vegetation, so it favors wind erosion.

Vertical loess joints 
Loess vertical joints distribution depends on the loess structure, water moisture, strata and microtopography. There are vertical development features and lateral development features.

Vertical development features 

Vertically, joints can be found in different loess strata, including late, middle and early Pleistocene loess layers. It is one of the most significant structures of the Loess Plateau. The development and size of the vertical loess joints depend on the vegetation coverage and slope. Steep slope and poor vegetation coverage favor the development of the joints. Many vertical loess joints can be easily found on the vertical cliffs of tableland.
The joints and the loess-paleosol interface are orientated perpendicularly. Also, in a dry loess layer, vertical loess joints are the wet part of it. Therefore, it is very difficult to notice the loess vertical joints in deep strata.
The water from rainfall and irrigation will infiltrate into the loess strata through the vertical joint surface and pore concentration zone.
The joint systems in the loess strata are of different sizes, properties, periods, and origins. Loess Vertical Joints distribute all over the loess plateau. The joints in landslides can be categorized by their different features.

The original joints are formed on the major scarp, minor scarp, original vertical cliffs and flanks. They are no displacement and closed.

Unloading vertical joints and weathering vertical joints are at the top and edge of the slope or landslides and mostly in open shape and with little displacement.

Sliding joints are in the body of landslides. Usually they are step-shaped and with large displacement.

Collapsible joints are formed when there is asymmetrical settlement during rainfall or irrigation. They are located far from the edge of tableland and with apparent displacement.

Lateral development features 
The lateral development of the vertical loess joints can be divided into four stages.

In the development stage original vertical joints, unloading joints and weathering joints can be found. In this range, the joints are mainly weathering joints and unloading joints. Nothing fill in the joint surfaces.

In the micro-development stage the distribution of the loess joints is sparser. The joints are filling with fine sand. This indicates the infiltration of water and accumulation of the sediments in the water.

In the underdevelopment stage a few or nearly zero joints are found.

And lastly in the undeveloped stage no vertical joint is found. The loess is very dry. The average moisture content is 16.22%.

Gullies 

Gully erosion acts as an important source for sediments. If an area has gully erosion, it means that the area has serious land degradation. In the Loess Plateau, the contribution of gully erosion on total sediment production in the hilly areas is about 60% to 90%. It is serious in the Loess Plateau. To know the contribution of gully erosion, we can measure the gully volume changes.

There are three types of gullies in the Loess Plateau, including floor gullies, hill slope gullies and valley bank gullies.

Geological development 

In conclusion, the geomorphic outline of the Loess Plateau was shaped by the tectonic movement since Neogene. After that, because of the East Asia Monsoon in Quaternary, the loess and different erosional features started to form. However, because of human activities, many areas in the Loess Plateau turned into erosional environments.

Loess deposits

Formation of loess 

Loess does not necessarily mean the same as silt. Loess is yellow eolian sediments that were transported by wind from an arid or semi-arid region during the Quaternary period. Around 6% of the land in the world is covered with loess. Loess record the past climate and environment.

Chinese Loess Plateau is one of the largest sinks of loess in the world. When the sediments are transported to the Loess Plateau, they are silt materials. After they deposit in arid areas and under strong chemical weathering and the process of carbonation, loess is formed. Two types of loess are defined by their formation process.

Typical loess is loess that is deposited during late Pleistocene and Holocene. It is formed under arid or semi-arid conditions.

Secondary loess is loess that is compacted by upper loess and does not experience the weathering and carbonation process. Also, it is formed by the transformation of fluvial and lake loess in semi-arid areas.

Distribution of loess 

Both the thickness and the size of loess decrease from northwest to southeast. The figure shows the topography of the Chinese Loess Plateau. The loess near the Liu-p’an Mts is the thickest which is around 200 m to 300 m while the loess near the Yellow River is around 100 m thick. This is related to the sorting by wind. When the monsoon wind and dust storm are blown from the northwest, it carries the loess of different sizes. When it arrives at the Loess Plateau, the energy of the wind starts to decrease, so it drops the largest and heaviest loess first. It continues to move towards the southeast of the Loess Plateau, the energy of the wind keeps decreasing. Therefore, the finest loess materials are deposited at the southeast end of the Plateau. That is why the coarsest loess is at the northwest of the Loess Plateau while the finest is at the southeast.

Some studies found that the loess that formed during Middle Pleistocene is expansive and thick. Therefore, the main period for the formation of the Loess Plateau is Middle Pleistocene.
Most of the loess in the west of Liupan Mountain is yellow. However, the loess in the east has many different colors, such as deep reddish-orange, brownish-gold. The color differences indicate that Liupan Mountain was formed before the loess deposition and it caused the different properties of the loess in different sides of the mountain.

Sedimentation of loess 
Most of the loess is deposited and well preserved at "Yuans", which are very flat. Some studies found that the apparent sedimentation rate, which determines the changes of the rate of deposition, has similar changes as the grain size changes. When the grain size increases, the apparent sedimentation rate also increases. There are two reasons.

There are other factors that control the grain size changes. Besides the variations in the wind intensity, the grain size may also affect by the aridity of the source areas. This changes the transporting distance of the sediments. During interglacial periods, the Loess Plateau retreated northwesterly while it moves towards the southeast during glacial periods. Therefore, the distance between the source areas and the Loess Plateau changes a lot. The grain size will increase in some northwest areas during glacial periods, even though the wind intensity does not change.

This may also be associated with the transporting winds. During glacial periods, the Siberian High is enhanced, and the winter monsoon become drier and stronger. Therefore, the amount and grain size of the sediments will increase.

Mineralogy of loess 

More than 90% of the loess is calcite, feldspar, mica and quartz. Among that, around 50% is quartz. The 10% left are orthoclase, viitaniemiite, sudoite, clinochlore and nimite.

From the mineralogical, isotopic, and chemical results, it is easy to find the provenance of the loess.

Provenance of loess deposits

Sources 

The source of loess in the Chinese Loess Plateau is the Gobi Desert and the desert nearby, including the Tengger Desert, Badain Jaran Desert, Ulan Buh Desert, Mu Us Desert and Hobq Desert. However, the main source is the Gobi Desert. This is proven because their minerals, isotopes and chemicals are similar. Both of the places have quartz as the main mineral of the loess. The value of 87Sr/86Sr is extremely high and both of them have high Eu/Yb and Eu/Eu ratios, which are trace elements. These data prove that the loess is from the Gobi Desert. The Gobi Desert is located at the north of the plateau. Although the distance between the Gobi Desert and the Chinese Loess Plateau is quite far, it is possible that the loess can travel such a great distance. There are a few reasons why the source of loess is from the Gobi Desert and the sand deserts.

Prevailing wind: The prevailing wind of the sand deserts and Gobi Desert are from the northwest. Since the Gobi Desert and the sand deserts are located northwest of the Chinese Loess Plateau, the prevailing wind builds a linkage for all these places. The loess can travel to the plateau through the prevailing wind.

No mountain in between: In the transport pathway of the dust, there is no high mountain in between. In the situation where high mountains block the dust when the dust is transporting, the dust may deposit at the windward slope of the mountain.

Monsoon is also important to determine the source of loess because monsoon will affect the wind direction. There are winter monsoonal winds flowing from Mongolia because of the high-pressure cell in Siberian-Mongolia. This plays an important role in transporting dust and loess to the Loess Plateau.

Dust storm: This is the most important factor. During Spring, many strong dust storms happen in the Loess Plateau which usually last for more than two days. With a longer dust storm event, the loess can travel a longer distance. The dust storm is blown from northwest to the Loess Plateau.

Origin of the loess 
Although the source of loess materials is from the Gobi Desert and the sand deserts, they are not produced by those deserts. The three mountains, including the Gobi Altay Mountains, the Hangayn Mountains and the Qilian Mountains are responsible for making loess materials for the desert and plateau.

High elevation: According to the environmental lapse rate, the air temperature will decrease by 6 °C per 1000 m. Therefore, the higher the mountain, the more extreme climate. All three mountains are higher than 2500 m, ranging from 2500 m to 5500 m. The mountain top may have a temperature around 0 °C or even below 0 °C. This favors the frost weathering process and freeze-thaw cycles which lead to physical weathering of the rocks at the mountain top. This process changes the rocks into small sized grains.

High relief and gradient: When the melting water and river water from the mountain water flows down from the mountain top, it creates a large amount of potential energy because of the slope gradient and high relief. When the water flows through the valleys and unstable rocky slopes, many clastic materials are washed away by the water. The removed materials are transported by the water and deposited in mountain foot and lowland basins. This may even form alluvial fans. There is a huge alluvial fan at the mountain foot of the Gobi Altay Mts. Therefore, the sediments and sands of the desert are from the mountain. After that, the wind will transport the sediments to the Loess Plateau and sort the sediments.

Tectonic activities: When there are tectonic activities in High Asia, energy is released. This causes the denudation of the rock and downcutting of rivers of the mountains. Loess materials are formed from the mountains during tectonic activities.
Besides, the sediments are also produced by the eolian abrasion process in the deserts and the Yellow River. However, these are not the major sources of loess.

Therefore, the loess in the Chinese Loess Plateau is mainly produced by the three mountain ranges and deposited in the deserts. Through monsoon wind and dust storms, the loess is transported to the Loess Plateau.

Climate and environment

Climate and environmental changes 

The population of the Loess Plateau has been increasing since the 1600s. In 2000, the population has increased to 104 million. The rapid population growth has brought some environmental problems to Loess Plateau. For instance, deforestation. People clear the forest to get more land for agriculture activities and use the wood for fuel and building materials. This is the reason why the forest cover has decreased dramatically. There are more and more abnormal and extreme natural hazards in the Loess Plateau. This may be related to the climate and environmental changes.

Natural hazards 
Different natural hazards connected with the Loess Plateau include dust storms, floods and droughts, locust swarms and landslides.

The number of dust storm events is increasing and they have become stronger.
The materials can be carried by the dust storm for a very long distance. It affects Korea, Japan, and even the European Alps. The impacts of dust storms can be very huge. Dust storms can bury gigantic farmlands and affect the human respiratory system. They will also cause the death of livestock and humans.

The frequency of floods and droughts is closely related. This is because the increase in drought indicates that the weather has become more extreme. The number of floods will also increase.
The frequency of floods and droughts is increasing abnormally.

The Loess Plateau becomes more vulnerable to locust swarms because the climate becomes cooler and more humid. They will destroy the farmland and reduce crop yield.

From 1965 to 1979, more than 1000 landslides that happened in the Loess Plateau were triggered by earthquake shocks and monsoonal summer rainfall.

Sustainable development 
Soil erosion in the Loess Plateau is affected by many factors, including vegetation cover, precipitation, strength of winds, climate etc. However, human activities contribute the most to soil erosion in the Loess Plateau in recent years. The population in the Chinese Loess Plateau has tripled from 1949 to 2000. It has reached 104 million people in 2000. More than 70% of slope land is used for agricultural activities. The farming activities on the steep slopes exposed the loess materials on the slope. When there is heavy rainfall and storms, the loess are easily washed away, which cause serious soil erosion. Most of the grassland is overgrazed and facing land degradation problem. Also, mining and construction also contribute in causing soil erosion.

Therefore, the Chinese government realized that it is critical to promote sustainable farming and soil conservation strategies in the Loess Plateau. The institute of soil and water conservation promoted a principle for conservational eco-agricultural construction. There are four main strategies:

 Restore vegetation, including grass and shrubs.
 Build essential grain cropland, such as terracing.
 Plant more cash crops and trees.
 Animal husbandry.

The conservation and sustainable construction is divided into three stages:

References 

Plateaus of China
Landforms of Gansu
Landforms of Inner Mongolia
Landforms of Ningxia
Landforms of Shaanxi
Landforms of Shanxi